Rai Bahadur Siddheshwar Mitter was a civil servant in British India.

Background
He was born in Hooghly-Konnagar in the erstwhile undivided province of Bengal. He was closely related to Brajendranath De

Career
He was a civilian employed in the Indian Foreign Department. In the initial years of his career, he worked as Sir Francis Younghusband's Confidential Assistant in Lhasa. He did useful work in Nepal and Indore as well. Later, he was appointed by Colonel Daly, the Agent of the Governor-General in Central India, as Dewan of Chhatarpur State, a Rajput State in Central India. For the services he rendered to the British and the Indian States, he received the decoration of Rai Bahadur.

References

1865 births
1912 deaths
Administrators in the princely states of India
Bengali people
Indian Civil Service (British India) officers
Indian dewans
Indian diplomats
People from Hooghly district
University of Calcutta alumni